Anne Lydia "Annelien" Bredenoord (born 1 August 1979) is a Dutch politician and professor of biomedical ethics. She is the current rector magnificus of the Erasmus University Rotterdam. Since 2019, she serves as the parliamentary leader of Democrats 66 (D66) in the Senate.

Biography 
Annelien Bredenoord studied theology and political science at Leiden University and obtained her PhD in medical ethics at Maastricht University. Since 9 June 2015, she is a member of the Senate for D66. In February 2017, she was appointed as professor of biomedical ethics at the University Medical Center Utrecht. Since 11 June 2019, she serves as the parliamentary leader of D66 in the Senate. On 1 October 2021, Bredenoord became the first female rector magnificus of the Erasmus University Rotterdam.

References 

Living people
1979 births
Democrats 66 politicians
Dutch ethicists
Dutch women academics
Academic staff of Erasmus University Rotterdam
Leiden University alumni
Maastricht University alumni
Members of the Senate (Netherlands)
Politicians from Utrecht (city)
Rectors of universities in the Netherlands
Academic staff of Utrecht University